India vs England is an Indian Kannada-language romantic thriller film directed by Nagathihalli Chandrashekar and produced by Y. N. Shankaregowda and several non-resident Indians from the UK and other countries. The film stars Vasishta Simha and Manvitha. The film was released on 26 January 2020.

The film features Vasishta as a British-born NRI, and actors Anant Nag in pivotal roles. The music is scored by Arjun Janya and cinematographers Will Price and Satya Hegde are in charge of cinematography.

Plot
Kanishka is a vlogger from the UK, while Medini is a gemology apprentice. Kanishka comes to India.  Initially, they don't like each other, but destiny makes them travel together across the country. On their journey, they come across a valuable gemstone which gets lost. The gem gets smuggled to England. How they fix the things and how they realize their love for each other forms the crux of the story.

Cast
 Vasishta N. Simha as Kanishka, a vlogger in the UK
 Manvitha Harish as Medini, Gemology Apprentice
 Anant Nag as Gemologist 
 Sumalatha as Kanishka's mother
 Prakash Belawadi as Kanishka's father
 Siri Hampapur as Nisha, Kanishka's sister
 Sadhu Kokila
 Gopal Kulkarni 
 Lex Lamprey as Rupert
 Sal Yusuf as John
 Nagathihalli Chandrashekar in a cameo
Michael Fields body guard
Mathew Doman.  body guard
Chris Woods Auctioneer

Production
Half of the film was shot in the U.K. Four songs of the film are shot in London, Cardiff and Wales in the U.K. An aide-memoire of British rule in India; shot in historical places of India such Ras Amritsar, Jhansi, Delhi, Jaipur, Mumbai, and Kittur. The film also features the Wagah Border Beating Retreat Ceremony and the Andaman Cellular Jail.

Soundtrack

Arjun has been signed to compose the score and songs for the film.

References

External links 

2020 films
2020s Kannada-language films
Films shot in Bangalore
Films shot in London
Films scored by Arjun Janya
Indian nonlinear narrative films
Indian romantic thriller films
2020s romantic thriller films
2020 romance films
2020 thriller films
Films directed by Nagathihalli Chandrashekhar